David Salomon may refer to:

 David Salomon (author), American author and photographer
 David S. Salomon (born 1947), cancer researcher
 David Salomon (cyclist), Bronze medalist at the 2008 Mexican National Road Race Championships

See also
David Solomon (disambiguation)
David Solomons (disambiguation)